Furukoba Dam is an earthen dam located in Saga Prefecture in Japan. The dam is used for agriculture and water supply. The catchment area of the dam is 2.5 km2. The dam impounds about 14  ha of land when full and can store 1172 thousand cubic meters of water. The construction of the dam was started on 1973 and completed in 1998.

References

Dams in Saga Prefecture
1998 establishments in Japan